Maria Henrietta de la Cherois Crommelin, known as May de la Cherois Crommelin, (1850–1930) was a novelist and travel writer born in Ulster, Ireland at Carrowdore Castle in County Down. On the death of her brother, Frederick Armand, who succeeded their father Samuel Arthur Hill de la Cherois Crommelin, J.P. D.L. as head of the family, May and her sisters Evelyn and Caroline (Mrs Robert Barton Shaw), were recognised jointly as heads of the family of de la Cherois Crommelin.

While growing up, she and her family often lived elsewhere because of the political situation at home, and Crommelin was educated by governesses. The family moved to England in the 1880s and after the death of her traditionalist father in 1885 she lived independently in her own flat in London. Though her family were "French gentry"- the Crommelins being in possession of considerable property at Armandcourt in Picardy and created Seigneurs de Camas- and descended from the Huguenot linen merchant Louis Crommelin, they were not at all wealthy, and Crommelin earned a living by writing. One of her cousins was the astronomer Andrew Claude de la Cherois Crommelin.

Writing
She travelled widely, going to the Andes (which she described in her 1896 work Over the Andes From the Argentine to Chili and Peru), the West Indies, North Africa and elsewhere. She wrote 42 novels, which were often based upon her travels. Her first, Queenie, was published in 1874. Orange Lily of 1879 is set in Ulster, where she was born. In 1884 she published Joy, set on Dartmoor where she first lived after coming to England; and her Cross-Roads of 1890 relies on her knowledge of France and Italy. Her work met with mixed reviews: for instance Goblin Gold (1885) was disparaged at the time. She also contributed travel pieces and short stories to magazines like The Idler.

References

Oxford Companion to Edwardian Fiction 1900–14: New Voices in the Age of Uncertainty, ed.Kemp, Mitchell, Trotter (OUP 1997)
The Bibliophile Dictionary, ed. Dole, Morgan, Ticknor (1904)
Evelyn O'Callaghan, "A Hot Place, belonging to Us": The West Indies in Nineteenth Century Travel Writing by Women in Landscape and Empire ed. Hooper (Ashgate 2005)

External links
 
 

1849 births
1930 deaths
19th-century Irish novelists
19th-century travel writers
20th-century novelists from Northern Ireland
Women novelists from Northern Ireland
British travel writers
Irish travel writers
Irish women non-fiction writers
British women travel writers
19th-century British women writers
19th-century British writers
20th-century British women writers
People from County Down